Renee Kimberly Flavell (born 28 March 1982 in Auckland) is a badminton player from New Zealand.

Career 
Renee Flavell took part at the 2008 Beijing Olympic Games and reached rank 9 in the mixed doubles. At the 2006 Oceania championships she won two bronze medals and one silver medal. Two years later Flavell won two silver medals. In 2007 she triumphed at the Australian Open.

Results

External links 
 
 Player profile at AuckBad.co.nz

New Zealand female badminton players
Badminton players at the 2008 Summer Olympics
Olympic badminton players of New Zealand
1982 births
Living people